Kilippattu  or parrot song is a genre of Malayalam poems in which the narrator is a parrot, a bee, a swan, and so on. Kiḷippaṭṭu was popularized by the 16th-century poet Ezhuthachan (The Father Of The Malayalam language).

In Adhyathmaramayanam (work of Ezhuthachan), each chapter starts with calling of parrot and asking it tell song of Rama.

Famous kiḷippaṭṭu
 Adhyathmaramayanam - Ezhuthachan
 Mahabharatham kilippattu - Ezhuthachan
 Sivapuranam kilippattu - Kunchan Nambiar
 Devimahathmyam Kilippattu

Malayalam-language poems